Senator Melvin may refer to:

Al Melvin (politician) (born 1944), Arizona State Senate
Woodrow M. Melvin (1912–1994), Florida State Senate